Marjan Jahangiri FRCS, FRCS (CTh) is Professor of Cardiac Surgery at St. George's Hospital, University of London. She was the first woman to be appointed professor of cardiac surgery in the United Kingdom and Europe.

Early life
Professor Jahangiri was the first woman to be appointed Professor of Cardiac Surgery in the United Kingdom and Europe, receiving her MBBS from UCL in 1988.

Career
Marjan Jahangiri graduated in medicine from University College Hospital, London and then completed her general surgical training at University College London and affiliated hospitals. She trained at the London Chest, St Bartholomew's and the Royal Brompton Hospitals in London. She was awarded a research fellowship at the William Harvey Laboratories at St. Bartholomew's Hospital and Medical School.

She then subspecialized in paediatric and adult congenital surgery at Great Ormond Street Hospital and Children's Hospital in Boston, Harvard. She was appointed Consultant Cardiac Surgeon and Senior Lecturer in 2001 at St. George's Hospital, University of London and then appointed Professor of Cardiac Surgery at University of London in 2007.

Professor Jahangiri has been in charge of the London Training Programme for Cardiothoracic Surgery and in 2019 was appointed Chair of the Specialty Advisory Committee of the Surgical Royal Colleges.

Research and selected publications

 Edlin J, Youssefi P, Figueroa CA, Morgan R, Nowell J, Jahangiri M. "Haemodynamic assessment of bicuspid aortic valve aortopathy: a systematic review of the current literature" European Journal of Cardio-Thoracic Surgery, 2019;55: 610–617.
 Acharya M, Youssefi P, Soppa G, Valencia O, Nowell J, Kanagasaby R, Edsell M, Morgan R, Tome M, Jahangiri M. "Corrigendum to: Analysis of aortic area/height ratio in patients with thoracic aortic aneurysm and Type A dissection" European Journal of Cardio-Thoracic Surgery, 2018;1;794.
 Diab M, Bilkhu R, Soppa G, Edsell M, Fletcher N, Heinerg J, Roysw C, Jahangiri M. "The influence of prolonged intensive care stay on quality of life, recovery and clinical outcomes following cardiac surgery: A prospective cohort study" Journal of Thoracic and Cardiovascular Surgery, 2018;156:1906–1915.
 Bilkhu R, Youssefi P, Soppa G, Theodoropoulos P, Phillips S, Liban b, Child A, Tome M, Nowell J, Sharma R, Edsell M, Jahangiri M. "Fate of Aortic Arch Following Surgery on Aortic Root and Ascending Aorta in Bicuspid Aortic Valve" Annals of Thoracic Surgery, 2018; 106: 771–776
 "Dilatation of the remaining aorta after aortic valve or aortic root replacement in patients with bicuspid aortic valve: a 5-year follow-up" Abdulkareem N., Soppa G., Jones S., Valencia O., Smelt J., Jahangiri M. Annals of Thoracic Surgery 2013;96: 43–9.
 "Left ventricular remodeling after transcatheter aortic valve implantation: one-year follow-up study" Zakkar M., Alassar A., Lopez-Perez M., Roy D., Brecker S., Sharma R., Jahangiri M. Innovations, 2015;44-7.
 "Incidence and mechanisms of cerebral ischemia after transcatheter aortic valve implantation compared with surgical aortic valve replacement" Alassar A., Soppa G., Edsell M., Rich P., Roy D., Chis Ster I., Joyce R., Valencia O., Barrick T., Howe F., Moat N., Morris R., Markus H.S., Jahangiri M. Annals of Thoracic Surgery, 2015;99: 802–8.
 "Perioperative management and outcomes of aortic surgery during pregnancy" Yates M.T., Soppa G., Smelt J., Fletcher N., van Besouw J.P., Thilaganathan B., Jahangiri M.J. Journal of Thoracic and Cardiovascular Surgery, 2015;149: 607–10.
 "Aortic root surgery: Does high surgical volume and a consistent perioperative approach improve outcome?" Bilkhu R., Youssefi P., Soppa G., Sharma R., Child A., Edsell M., van Besouw J.P., Jahangiri M. Semin Journal of Thoracic and Cardiovascular Surgery, 2016;28: 302–309.
 "Functional assessment of thoracic aortic aneurysm – the future of risk prediction" Youssefi P., Sharma R., Figueroa C.A., Jahangiri M. British Medical Bulletin, 2016.
 "Patients-specific computational dynamics-assessment of aortic hemodynamics in a spectrum of aortic valve pathologies" Youssefi P., Gomez A., He T., Anderson L., Bunce N., Sharma R., Figueroa C.A., Jahangiri M.J. Journal of Thoracic and Cardiovascular Surgery, 2017;153: 8–20.

Awards and honours
She was elected as a member of the American Association for Thoracic Surgery. In 2018 she was awarded the BMJ Clinical Leadership Team.

References 

 Professor Marjan Jahangiri. St. George's Aortic Team. Retrieved 1 September 2018.
 Professor Marjan Jahangiri. St George's University of London. Retrieved 1 September 2018.
 Professional profile. Spire Healthcare. Retrieved 1 September 2018.
 Trailblazing female heart surgeon 'forced out' from unit by colleagues 'envious of her success'. Victoria Ward, The Telegraph, 24 August 2018. Retrieved 1 September 2018.
 Judge overturns south London hospital's ban on heart surgeon. The Guardian, 28 August 2018. Retrieved 1 September 2018.
 Judge overturns Marjan Jahangiri’s suspension from St George’s hospital. Chris Smyth, The Times, 29 August 2018. Retrieved 1 September 2018.
 Joint public statement regarding Professor Marjan Jahangiri, Consultant Cardiac Surgeon. St George's Hospital, 20 May 2019

External links 
Marjan Jahangiri speaking about her work.

Living people
Physicians of St George's Hospital
Alumni of University College London
Fellows of the Royal College of Surgeons
Alumni of the University of London
British cardiac surgeons
Women surgeons
Year of birth missing (living people)